Ozdowski is a Polish surname. Notable people with the surname include:

 Jerzy Ozdowski (1925–1994), Polish economist
 Mike Ozdowski (born 1955), American football player
 Sev Ozdowski (born 1949), Australian human rights advocate

Polish-language surnames